Teachers is a 1984 American satirical black comedy-drama film written by W. R. McKinney, directed by Arthur Hiller, and starring Nick Nolte, JoBeth Williams, Ralph Macchio, and Judd Hirsch. It was shot in Columbus, Ohio, mostly at the former Central High School.

Plot 

On a typical Monday morning at John F. Kennedy High School in the inner city of Columbus, Ohio, there is conflict between teachers, a student with a stab wound and a talk of an upcoming lawsuit. Vice principal Roger Rubell and principal Eugene Horn meet with lawyer Lisa Hammond, who is in charge of depositions for a recent graduate's lawsuit against the school for granting him a diploma despite his illiteracy.

Alex Jurel is a veteran social studies teacher who takes his job lightly and is popular because he can identify and connect with students. Alex has been worn down by years of coming between the rowdy students and the demands of the administration. He is assigned to temporarily assume the duties of the school psychologist and becomes a mentor to student Eddie Pilikian. Alex also develops a romance with Lisa, his former student.

Herbert Gower is a mental-institution outpatient who has been mistaken for a substitute teacher and placed in charge of a history class that he makes fun, educational and engaging. Sleepy old English teacher Mr. Stiles does not actually teach his students but just hands out worksheet photocopies for his students to complete during class, and he dies unnoticed in his sleep while in class. Gym teacher Mr. Troy has a sexual relationship with a student. Eddie's best friend Danny, a schizophrenic and kleptomaniac student, is shot and killed by the police after he draws a gun during a drug search.

Superintendent Donna Burke and school lawyer Al Lewis are attempting to avoid bad publicity associated with the lawsuit. They try to determine which teachers might damage the school's reputation in their depositions.

The administration recognizes the threat that Alex poses to their social standing and forces him to resign before his deposition. After Lisa harshly criticizes him, he finally stands up to Burke and Rubell, reminding them that the school exists for the students and not for the administrators. He also threatens a lawsuit if he is fired. He proudly walks back into the school to loud cheers from the students.

Cast
 Nick Nolte as Alex Jurel
 JoBeth Williams as Lisa Hammond
 Judd Hirsch as Vice Principal Roger Rubell
 Ralph Macchio as Eddie Pilikian
 Allen Garfield as Carl Rosenberg
 Lee Grant as Dr. Donna Burke
 Richard Mulligan as Herbert Gower
 Royal Dano as Kenneth Stiles a.k.a. Ditto 
 William Schallert as Principal Horn
 Art Metrano as Troy
 Laura Dern as Diane Warren
 Crispin Glover as Danny Reese
 Morgan Freeman as Alan Lewis
 Madeleine Sherwood as Grace Wensel
 Steven Hill as Sloan
 Zohra Lampert as Mrs. Pilikian
 Mary Alice as Linda Ganz
 Terry Ellis as Tim Hahn
 Ronald Hunter as Mr. Pilikian
 Virginia Capers as landlady
 Ellen Crawford as Social Worker
 Vivian Bonnell as Nurse
 Cacey Kustosz as Field Trip Educator
 Anthony Heald as Narc
 Katharine Balfour as Theresa Bloom
 Jeff Ware as Malloy
 Richard Zobel as Propes
 George Dzundza as paramedic (uncredited)

Critical response
The film opened to mixed reviews, and some reviewers felt that it lacked the incisive touch of Paddy Chayefsky's satires (he had previously written Hiller's other dark satire, 1971's The Hospital).

On review aggregator Rotten Tomatoes, the film holds an approval rating of 59% based on 32 reviews, with an average rating of 5.60/10. The website's critical consensus reads, "With moments of stinging satire undermined by jarring tonal shifts, Teachers offers an education in the limits of a strong cast's ability to prop up uneven writing." On Metacritic, the film received a score of 39 based on 8 reviews, indicating "generally unfavorable reviews".

Dave Kehr of the Chicago Reader remarked that "the characters [in the film] have all been invented for strictly didactic purposes: they come on waving their moral conflicts like big white bed sheets, and as soon as you see them you can predict every trite turn of the plot."

A critic for Variety said that the film "makes stinging, important points about the mess of secondary public education, but [that] those points are diluted gradually by an overload of comic absurdity."

Roger Ebert remarked that "the idea here was to do for teaching what M*A*S*H* did for the war. Unfortunately, they've done for schools what General Hospital did for medicine. Teachers has an interesting central idea, about shell-shocked teachers trying to remember their early idealism, but the movie junks it up with so many sitcom compromises that we can never quite believe the serious scenes." Ebert ended his review: "Here's the sad bottom line: Teachers was just interesting enough to convince me a great movie can be made about big-city high schools. This isn't it."

Pat Collins of the CBS Morning News remarked that "there's an overwhelming urge to take out a giant eraser and wipe the screen clean of what is absolutely the worst 'high school is a jungle' movie to come down the locker line corridor in a long time," singling out "the ham in the performances of the actors who have all done better in the past" before calling the film "a shrill, preachy and superficial treatment of the subject of public school education." Collins continued: "[T]eachers, students and parents in the real world don't need Hollywood to tell them what's wrong with the problems of public schools ... compared to Teachers, homework is more fun."

Soundtrack

 "Teacher, Teacher" - 38 Special
 "One Foot Back in Your Door" - Roman Holliday
 "Edge of a Dream" - Joe Cocker
 "Interstate Love Affair" - Night Ranger
 "Foolin' Around" - Freddie Mercury
 "Cheap Sunglasses" - ZZ Top
 "Understanding" - Bob Seger
 "I Can't Stop the Fire" - Eric Martin & Friends
 "In the Jungle (Concrete Jungle)" - The Motels
 "(I'm the) Teacher" - Ian Hunter

The theme song by 38 Special was released as a single and reached No. 25 on the Billboard Hot 100 singles chart. "Understanding" by Seger reached No. 17 and Cocker's "Edge of a Dream" hit No. 69.

Cash Box said of Seger's "Understanding" that it "is by and large successful in bringing together a good, singable melody, meaningful lyrics, and superb performances" but said that the chorus "remains on one plateau and never fully takes hold."

References

External links
 
 

1984 films
1980s black comedy films
1980s coming-of-age comedy-drama films
1980s high school films
1980s satirical films
American coming-of-age comedy-drama films
American high school films
American satirical films
1980s English-language films
Films about educators
Films directed by Arthur Hiller
Films set in Columbus, Ohio
Films shot in Ohio
Metro-Goldwyn-Mayer films
United Artists films
1980s American films